Kirchham (literally "Churcham") is a municipality in the district of Passau in Bavaria in Germany.

Kirchham has 27 Ortsteile (subdivisions):

Kirchham is twinned with Churcham, England.

References

Passau (district)